Blakiston is a town in the Australian state of South Australia. Its postal code is 5250 – though it has no post office. Post is delivered to the neighbouring town of Littlehampton which shares the post code. The town and surrounding countryside make up around 16 square kilometres. At the 2016 census, the locality of Blakiston and some adjoining land in Littlehampton had a population of 381.

Blakiston has been occupied by white settlers since 1846. The town was founded by Francis Davison and named for his ancestral home, Blakiston Hall in County Durham. Its main (only) landmarks include a roadside pub and stage house (currently a private house), a cheese factory converted to a private residence, St James Church (consecrated in 1846) and neighbouring rectory, a demolished school house and the large residence of Blakiston House as well as a smaller residence. Rumour has it that the old school house was in fact demolished by rampaging cattle some time in the mid-20th century. All of these structures date from the mid to late 19th century and are constructed from a mix of pink sandstone and red brick.  On the lower east wall of the Church are some small carvings of sailing ships, possibly dating back to the mid-19th century. Blakiston is surrounded by a mixture of pastureland and eucalyptus forest and includes a few other houses dating from the mid twentieth century.

Blakiston has no signs or markers indicating that it is a separate town from the close by town of Littlehampton. In fact Blakiston is in the process of being absorbed into the suburban area of Littlehampton and as a result is losing much of its individual character.

St James Church of England
St James Church of England, in the town of Blakiston, is the fifth oldest Anglican Church in South Australia. The  of the Church, Cemetery and Rectory was bought by George Morphett and Samuel Stocks from McFarlane in 1843 and was given for the building of the church in May 1846. The parsonage was completed, and occupied by the Rev. James Pollitt, in late 1846 and completion of the church building was promised for the following year.
Sentence of consecration was pronounced and the Church consecrated by the Lord Bishop of Adelaide on 28 April 1848. The Church is constructed of sandstone and includes the Chapel and Rector's changing room. The Church includes some pretty stained glass windows, old pews and a small organ. Adjacent to the Church is a small bell tower of later heritage. As of 2008, the Church and cemetery are still in use, while the Rectory and surrounding acreage are rented by the Church of England to private tenants.

The Rectory is a single story sandstone building dating back to the construction of the Church. It has six main rooms, including: a formal dining room, Rector's study, bedroom, formal living room, the original kitchen no longer in use, and another small room of unknown use. A newer addition was added to the house in the early 20th century which today includes the kitchen/breakfast room and a bathroom. The house has an old disused cellar. The roof of the Rectory is made of corrugated iron but hides an original timber shingle roof. The shingle roof can no longer be seen but is thought to be in pristine condition. A number of past tenants of the Rectory have reported sighting a ghostly figure in the Rector's study. The alleged apparition is of an old man, sitting and quietly reading.

Behind the Rectory was a three-sided barn, also made of sandstone, with an earth floor and corrugated iron roof. One of the walls collapsed in the early 1980s and was inadequately replaced with corrugated iron cladding. It has since been demolished. Nearby is also a brick outhouse.

In 1980, it was listed on the now-defunct Register of the National Estate.

References
Notes

Citations

Towns in South Australia